Firouz Gahvari is an American economist, focusing in public economics and optimal taxation, currently the Leiby Hall Distinguished Professor of Economics at University of Illinois.

References

Bibliography

Year of birth missing (living people)
Living people
University of Illinois faculty
American economists
University of California, Los Angeles alumni